The list of shipwrecks in September 1827 includes some ships sunk, wrecked or otherwise lost during September 1827.

1 September

6 September

7 September

8 September

9 September

10 September

12 September

13 September

19 September

20 September

21 September

22 September

25 September

28 September

Unknown date

References

1827-09